Cirripectes jenningsi is a species of combtooth blenny found in the Pacific ocean, from the Gilbert Islands to the Tuamotu Islands.  This species reaches a length of  SL. The specific name honours the Alexander Jennings who was the manager of Swains Island, one of the Phoenix Islands in American Samoa, where Schultz collected the type.

References

jenningsi
Fish described in 1943